William W. Wells, Jr. (December 14, 1837 – April 29, 1892) was a businessman, politician, and general in the Union Army during the American Civil War who received a Medal of Honor for gallantry at the Battle of Gettysburg.

Early life and career
Wells was born in Waterbury, Vermont, the third of ten children (nine boys) of William and Eliza Wells. He began his education in the common schools of his native town, and mastered the higher branches in Barre Academy and Kimball Union Academy in Meriden, New Hampshire. While in Barre at the age of 17, he used an odometer in surveying for a county map of Caledonia County, a task which occupied him for two months. From the age of nineteen until the spring of 1861, he was his father's assistant in his extensive business.

Civil War

At the outbreak of the Civil War, William Wells and three of his brothers joined the Union army. Wells enlisted as a private soldier on September 9, 1861, and assisted in raising Company C of the 1st Vermont Cavalry. He was sworn into Federal service October 3, 1861, and was soon promoted first lieutenant and then captain in November of that year. He was in the thickest of the fight at Orange Court House, Virginia, August 2, 1862, and was promoted to major on October 30, 1862.

Medal of Honor
Wells commanded the Second Battalion, 1st Vermont Cavalry, in the repulse of Stuart's Cavalry at the Battle of Hanover during the Gettysburg Campaign. In the famous and desperate cavalry charge on Big Round Top on the third day at Gettysburg (July 3, 1863), he commanded the leading battalion, rode by the side of General Farnsworth, the brigade commander, and, almost by a miracle, came out unharmed, while his commander fell in the midst of the enemy's infantry. A few days later, in the savage cavalry melee at the Battle of Boonsboro in Maryland, Wells was wounded by a sabre cut. At Culpeper Court House, Virginia, September 13, 1863, he charged the enemy's artillery with his regiment and captured a gun, and was again wounded, by a shell. Congress later awarded Wells a Medal of Honor "for distinguished gallantry at the battle of Gettysburg, July 3, 1863."

After the return of the regiment from the Kilpatrick raid, in March 1864, Major Wells was detached and placed in command of the 7th Michigan Cavalry (which had lost its commander) for a month. He commanded a battalion of Sheridan's cavalry at the Battle of Yellow Tavern, in which J.E.B. Stuart was killed. Wells was promoted to colonel on June 4, 1864. From September 1864 to April 1865, he was several times in command of the Third Cavalry Division. In the Battle of Tom's Brook, Virginia (October 9, 1864), a cavalry action, Wells commanded a brigade of Custer's division, and at Cedar Creek, his brigade took a foremost part in turning the rout of the morning into a decisive victory at nightfall, capturing forty-five of the forty-eight pieces of artillery taken from Jubal Early's fleeing army.

Wells was appointed brevet brigadier general of volunteers on February 22, 1865. On the personal recommendations of Generals Sheridan and Custer, Wells was commissioned brigadier general May 16, 1865, and he was appointed brevet major general of volunteers, March 30, 1865, "for gallant and meritorious service," having received more promotions than any other Vermont officer during the war (from Private to General in less than three and a half years). Wells served under Generals Kilpatrick, Sheridan, and Custer, and was with Kilpatrick in his famous raid on Richmond, and with James H. Wilson in his daring foray to the south of that city. At Appomattox Court House, on the morning of the surrender of the Army of Northern Virginia, Wells' brigade had started on its last charge and was stopped by General Custer in person. He distinguished himself repeatedly in action. Sheridan remarked: "He is my ideal of a cavalry officer."

Following Appomattox, the departure of Sheridan and Custer for Texas left Wells as the ranking officer and last commander of the Cavalry Corps of the Army of the Potomac. At the Grand Review in Washington, D.C. on May 22, 1865, he commanded the Second Brigade of Custer's Division of the Cavalry Corps, which led the advance.

Wells participated in seventy cavalry engagements, in eighteen of which he led a brigade or division. He was honorably mustered out of army January 15, 1866.

Postbellum career

Soon after General Wells' return to civil life, he became a partner in a firm of wholesale druggists at Waterbury. In 1868 they transferred their business to Burlington, which was thereafter his residence. He represented Waterbury in the legislature of 1865-66, being chairman of the military committee and an influential legislator. In 1866 he was elected adjutant general of Vermont, and held the office until 1872.  He was succeeded by James Stevens Peck and accepted appointment as collector of customs for the district of Vermont, a position which he filled with efficiency and credit for thirteen years. At the end of that time, he resumed his active connection with the business house known the world over as the Wells Richardson Company, manufacturer of Paine's Celery Compound. General Wells was married with two children — Frank Richardson and Bertha Richardson Wells (who later married Dr. Horatio Nelson Jackson).

In 1886, Wells was a member of the Vermont State Senate from Chittenden County, Vermont. He was active in veteran soldiers' societies; was one of the presidents of the Reunion Society of Vermont Officers, and president of the Society of the First Vermont Cavalry. He was one of the trustees, and first president of the Vermont Soldiers' Home, and was a member of the Gettysburg Commission of 1889-90. He was the first commander of the Vermont Commandery of the Loyal Legion, and would have been re-elected had he lived until the coming annual meeting of the Commandery. He was a member of Stannard Post, No. 2, G. A. R., Department of Vermont, and would have been made department commander several years ago had he been willing to accept an election as such. He was a member of the Vermont Society of Sons of the American Revolution.

General Wells was identified with many important business enterprises in the city, being president of the Burlington Trust Company, president of the Burlington Gas-Light Company, president of the Burlington Board of Trade, director in the Burlington Cold Storage Company, director in the Rutland Railroad Company and director in the Champlain Transportation Company. He was a member and a vestryman of St. Paul's church, and was one of the trustees of the Young Men's Christian Association of Burlington, and one of its most liberal supporters. Few men, if any, touched the life of the community in which he lived in so many important capacities.

His sudden death from angina pectoris in New York City removed, while in the prime of life, a most genial, courteous and kind-hearted man, a gallant soldier, and one of the most respected citizens of the Green Mountain state. Burlington effectively shut down for his funeral. His remains lie at Lakeview Cemetery on North Avenue.

See also

List of Medal of Honor recipients for the Battle of Gettysburg
List of American Civil War Medal of Honor recipients: T–Z
List of American Civil War generals (Union)

References

 

This article is a composite of information from the following articles, all of which are in the public domain:
Carleton, Hiram, Genealogical and Family History of the State of Vermont, New York: Lewis Publishing Company, 1903.
 Cross, David F., "A Tale of Two Statues: The William Wells Statues at Gettysburg and Burlington, Vermont." 
Jackson, H. Nelson, Dedication of the Statue to Brevet Major-General William Wells and the Officers and Men of the First Regiment Vermont Cavalry, on the Battlefield of Gettysburg July 3, 1913, Privately printed, 1914.
Vermont, Adjutant and Inspector General's Office. Revised Roster of Vermont Volunteers and lists of Vermonters who served in the Army and Navy of the United States During The War of the Rebellion, 1861-66, Montpelier, Vt: Press of the Watchman Publishing Co., 1892.

The three articles, in their entirety, with additional links and material, are available on the Vermont in the Civil War website.

1837 births
1892 deaths
Union Army generals
United States Army Medal of Honor recipients
People of Vermont in the American Civil War
Sons of the American Revolution
Vermont state senators
American Civil War recipients of the Medal of Honor
19th-century American politicians
Burials at Lakeview Cemetery (Burlington, Vermont)